M3 is the third album by American heavy metal band Mushroomhead. It was released independently in 1999 on their own label. There was a cd release party at their annual Halloween show on October 30th. This was the final studio album with JJ Righteous and Dinner as members of the band. The album, alongside Mushroomhead and Superbuick, were reissued with alternate artwork in 2002. The songs "Before I Die", "Solitaire/Unraveling", "Xeroxed" and "Born of Desire" were later included on both the Eclipse Records and Universal Records versions of XX in 2001.

Track listing

All Songs are written by Mushroomhead
"Before I Die" – 3:12
"Solitaire/Unraveling" – 4:34
"The New Cult King" – 5:07
"Inevitable" – 5:02
"Xeroxed" – 2:55
"The Final Act" – 4:43
"Conflict- The Argument Goes On…" – 2:41
"Exploiting Your Weakness" – 4:21
"Beauteous" – 3:11
"Born of Desire" – 4:02
"Dark and Evil Joe" (hidden track in earlier editions) – 12:17

"Dark and Evil Joe" is a prank phone call made to Joe Aufricht of the black metal band Satanicon.

Personnel 
Mushroomhead
 Jeffrey Nothing – vocals
 J Mann – vocals
 Pig Benis – bass
 J.J. Righteous – guitars
 Dinner – guitars
 Shmotz – keyboards, samples
 Bronson – samples, programming
 Skinny – drums
Featured personnel
 Scot Edgel – additional vocals (tracks 3 & 6)

References

Mushroomhead albums
1999 albums